Kevin Larroyer (born 19 June 1989) is a French professional rugby league footballer who plays as a second-row forward for the Halifax in the Betfred Championship.

He previously played for Toulouse Olympique, Catalans Dragons, Hull Kingston Rovers, Castleford Tigers (Heritage № 976) and the Bradford Bulls.

Background
Larroyer was born in Toulouse, France.

Club career

Toulouse Olympique
Larroyer began his professional career with Toulouse Olympique.

Catalans Dragons
He moved to the Catalans Dragons for the 2012 season.

Hull Kingston Rovers
In 2013, Larroyer was signed by Hull Kingston Rovers from Catalans Dragons on a season long loan deal. After an impressive season at Hull Kingston Rovers, making 22 appearances for the Robins and scoring seven tries the club extended Larroyer's loan deal for another year for season 2015.

In September 2015, the French international committed his future to Hull Kingston Rovers by signing a three-year deal taking his service with the Robins into 2018.

Castleford Tigers
He was released from his contract following Hull Kingston Rovers' relegation from Super League at the end of the 2016 season and subsequently joined Castleford Tigers in 2017.

Bradford Bulls
He spent time on loan at the Bradford Bulls to regain match fitness early in the 2017 season.

Leigh Centurions
Larroyer joined Leigh on 17 October 2017 on a two-year deal.

Halifax
In 2019, he signed a contract to join Halifax.  On 11 October 2020, he signed a one-year contract extension.

International career
In 2013 Larroyer was selected to represent his home country France in the Rugby League World Cup. Larroyer played for his country at the 2014 European Championship. During a 22-12 defeat by Ireland in Dublin, Larroyer scored a converted try for his home nation. During 2015 Larroyer played for France in the European Championship. France launched their 2015 European Championship campaign with a 31-14 victory over Ireland which went some way to erasing the memory of their defeat by the Wolfhounds in last year's corresponding fixture where Larroyer scored a try to help the French side secure their victory. In 2016 Larroyer was selected to play for his country in France's lone international against England in Avignon for the Four Nations where France showed a marked improvement from the last time they played against England.

References

External links

Leigh Centurions profile
Castleford Tigers profile
SL profile

1989 births
Living people
Bradford Bulls players
Castleford Tigers players
Catalans Dragons players
French rugby league players
France national rugby league team players
Halifax R.L.F.C. players
Hull Kingston Rovers players
Leigh Leopards players
Rugby league second-rows
Toulouse Olympique players